Sar Sakhti-ye Pain (also Romanized as Sar Sakhtī-ye Pā’īn; also known as Sar Sakhtī-ye Soflá, Sarsakhtī-ye Soflā, and Sarsakti) is a village in Qarah Kahriz Rural District, Qarah Kahriz District, Shazand County, Markazi Province, Iran. At the 2006 census, its population was 1,170, in 278 families.

References 

Populated places in Shazand County